Norm Hillard (3 June 1915 – 24 April 1986) was an Australian rules footballer who played with Hawthorn and Fitzroy in the Victorian Football League (VFL). 

Hillard played in the forward line during his time at Hawthorn, kicking a career best 31 goals in the 1937 season. During his time at Fitzroy however he was used in defence and was the club's centre half back in their 1944 premiership.  He was awarded best player in the 1944 premiership.

He later became coach of the Fitzroy Football Club 2nds team and was Chairman of Selectors for over two decades and also a longtime vice president of the club.

External links

2004 obituary of Maurie Hearn, mentioning Clen Denning and Laurie Bickerton as the surviving members of the Maroons' 1944 side

1915 births
1986 deaths
Australian rules footballers from Victoria (Australia)
Fitzroy Football Club players
Fitzroy Football Club Premiership players
Fitzroy Football Club coaches
Hawthorn Football Club players
Kew Football Club players
One-time VFL/AFL Premiership players